Judge Seymour may refer to:

Augustus Sherrill Seymour (1836–1897), judge of the United States District Court for the Eastern District of North Carolina
Margaret B. Seymour (born 1947), judge of the United States District Court for the District of South Carolina
Stephanie Kulp Seymour (born 1940), judge of the United States Court of Appeals for the Tenth Circuit

See also
Justice Seymour (disambiguation)